John Milfull (1940-2016) was an Australian academic, educator and professor. In 1971 he was appointed as Professor of German and Head of the School of German at the University of New South Wales.

In 1984 he became the Dean of Arts and Social Sciences there. He later founded that university's degree program in European Studies and founded its Centre for European Studies and in 1986 was appointed as Professor Emeritus and visiting professor in European Studies.

He was a member of the International Advisory Board for the journal Debatte: Journal of Contemporary Central and Eastern Europe and vice-president of the Contemporary European Studies Association of Australia.

Early life and education
Milfull was born John Rowland Milfull on 24 April 1940 in Sydney. His father was Tom Milfull, who taught mathematics at Sydney Grammar School from 1928 to 1933 and at Sydney Church of England Grammar School in the years 1939–71. His mother was Marion Milfull née Rowland, who was the daughter of Percy Fritz Rowland, the headmaster of Townsville Grammar School in the years 1905–1938, and Jessie Adeline.

After attending the Sydney Church of England Grammar School, John Milfull studied arts (German, English and music) at the University of Sydney, graduating with First Class Honours in German in 1961.

He spent a year studying German, English, and music at the University of Munich.

Career

University of Sydney
Returning to Australia, he worked as lecturer at the University of Sydney in 1963-64 In 1968 he would complete his Ph.D. at that same university.

University of New South Wales

In 1966 he was appointed as lecturer in German at the University of New South Wales. In 1969 he was promoted to Senior Lecturer there and two years later he became Professor of German (later German Studies), being at that time "one of the youngest professors appointed in Australia". He held this position until 1996.

He quickly set about transforming the School of German into a flourishing community and modernising and broadening the curriculum from a study of German language and literature to also include a study of "history, social sciences and politics, film and media".

In support of that goal, he recruited Gero von Wilpert and in 1976 he convinced the university administration "to 'import' three full-time lecturers from Germany". These were Gerhard Fischer, Bernd Hüppauf and Konrad Kwiet.

Milfull forged a close alliance with the Department of German at Monash University, where similar reforms had been undertaken by Professor Leslie Bodi. In his essay "German Studies at Monash University", Professor Philip Thomson praised Milfull's groundbreaking role:

of the eleven departments of German that then existed in Australian universities, only New South Wales, where John Milfull headed an energetic group, was engaged in the sort of German studies that Monash was committed to, broad-ranging, interdisciplinary and contemporary.

Milfull's innovation soon bore fruit. His School of German Studies, as it was now known, attracted international attention and distinguished scholars from Europe and North America came as visiting professors. Annual interdisciplinary symposia held on alternate occasions by the German departments of the UNSW and Monash University also attracted leading academics from abroad.

In 1979 he was praised by Professor J. M. Ritchie, the chair of German at the University of Sheffield, as one of 
the powerful generation of scholars raised in the Sydney school (...) who have already made the wider world of Germanistik aware of the new scholarship coming from Australia with major publications in book form on problems of modern German literature...

In 1980 he gave an invited lecture on "Visibility and Invisibility: Assimilation, Success, and the German-Jewish Paradox" at the Center for Advanced Holocaust Studies in the United States Holocaust Memorial Museum, Washington DC.

In 1984 he was appointed Dean of Arts and Social Sciences at the University of New South Wales, a position he held until 1993.

During this "time of reduced government funding, growing commercialisation of the university sector and dwindling enrolments in 'non-profitable' languages" along with "Australia’s turn towards Asia", he tried to protect the community of teachers, researchers and students that he had built up and to rethink "the structure and goals of the faculty".

Partly as a result of this, in 1984 Milfull established a degree program in European Studies at the UNSW and in 1996 he founded the UNSW's Centre for European Studies, of which he remained the director until his retirement in 2006. He used the centre to bring together diplomats and academics and to promote the "European idea" that in which he fervently believed. He was commended by Professor Frank B. Tipton for these achievements:
John Milfull deserves special mention for his efforts on behalf of German and European studies in Australia, efforts that have provided invaluable opportunities to exchange views with the broadest possible range of international scholars.

In 2006 he was appointed as Professor Emeritus and visiting professor in European Studies at the University of NSW.

Other university appointments

Apart from his years at University of New South Wales, he acted in 1994 as Acting Dean at the University of Adelaide and worked in 1995 as a Visiting Research Fellow in the School of European Studies at the University of Sussex.

In 1969 he was invited to the Free University Berlin as a Humboldt Scholar. He spent periods at the Technical University Berlin, at the Martin Luther University of Halle-Wittenberg and, as a lecturer, at the University of Cambridge.

Other appointments
From 1996 he was a member of the International Advisory Board for the journal Debatte: Journal of Contemporary Central and Eastern Europe.

In 1997 he was elected vice-president of the Contemporary European Studies Association of Australia.

In 1997 Milfull was appointed Director of the Centre for Intercultural Jewish Studies in Sydney, "a co-operative venture between Macquarie University, the University of New South Wales and the University of Sydney". He delivered the opening speech for this centre on 5 August 1997.

Research interests
Milfull's research interests included the following: "The German-Jewish Experience, Literature and Society in the German Democratic Republic, The Process and Impact of German Unification."

Personal life and death
He was married to Dr. Helen Mary Milfull, who graduated with a Ph.D. from the University of New South Wales in 1975. They had three daughters, Inge, Alison and Cathy.

During his life he maintained his interest in music and participated in concerts playing his flute. He also spoke out periodically on politics and current affairs.

He died in Canberra on 6 November 2016.

Select bibliography

Books: As author
From Baal to Keuner. The "Second Optimism" of Bertolt Brecht, Bern and Frankfurt am Main: Peter Lang, 1974.

Books: As editor
The Attractions of Fascism: Social Psychology and Aesthetics of the "Triumph of the Right", New York: Berg, 1990; London: Bloomsbury Academic, 1990.
Why Germany? National Socialist Anti-Semitism and the European Context, Providence: Berg, 1993.
Britain in Europe: Prospects for Change, Aldershot: Ashgate, 1999.

Articles
For extensive listings of articles in refereed journals, edited books and edited conference proceedings, see:  John Milfull's CV and Recent Essays by John Milfull.

Further articles and online republications of articles:
 "Cosi? Sexual Politics in Mozart's Operas", in: The Habsburg Legacy: National Identity in Historical Perspective, ed. Ritchie Robertson and Edward Timms, Edinburgh University Press, 1994.
 "La géographie poétique des « Elixirs du Diable»", in: Romantisme, No. 4, 1972, 65–75. Available online at: Romantisme, 1972, n°4. «Voyager doit être un travail sérieux.», persee.fr. Retrieved 9 April 2017.

References

Further reading
 Patrick O'Farrell, The University of New South Wales, 1949-1999. Sydney: University of New South Wales Press, 1999.

External links
Milfull, John - AHR. Articles published online in the Australian Humanities Review.
John Milfull, Google Scholar. Extensive listing of monographs and articles.
Photograph of John Milfull. Photo of Milfull (right) with Dr. Keeva Vozoff at a meeting of the Australian Association of von Humboldt Fellows, Sydney, 13 September 2008.

2016 deaths
Academic staff of the University of New South Wales
1940 births
Australian literary critics
University of Sydney alumni
Germanists